Anders Bäckström (born December 12, 1960) is a former Swedish professional ice hockey defenceman who played for Brynäs IF of the Swedish Elitserien. He was drafted by the New York Rangers in the 1980 NHL Entry Draft, but never made it to the NHL, playing 311 games in the SEL, scoring 28 goals and 66 assists for 94 total points.

He also served as the team manager for Brynäs IF from 1999 to 2002 and was an assistant coach for the team in the 2004–05 season.

His son, Nicklas, plays for the Washington Capitals of the NHL.

References

External links
Anders Bäckström's stats at eliteprospects

Living people
Brynäs IF players
New York Rangers draft picks
1960 births
Swedish ice hockey defencemen